Didelotia idae is a species of plant in the family Fabaceae. It is found in  Ivory Coast, Ghana,  Liberia and Sierra Leone. It is threatened by  habitat loss.

References 

Flora of West Tropical Africa
Detarioideae
Near threatened plants
Taxonomy articles created by Polbot